Bombe Guidée Laser (BGL) laser-guided bombs were developed by Matra (now MBDA) starting in 1978. The guidance system had to work using the same principles as the US Paveway guided bombs. The guidance kits were intended as modifications to existing free fall bombs that were in service with the French Air Force. The semi active laser homing (SALH) guidance system was developed starting from the AS-30 laser-guided missile sensor. The guidance system allowed for in-flight target illumination by the aircraft-mounted ATLIS 2 (Automatic Tracking Laser Illumination System) or with ground-based laser designator targeting pod.

The BGL targeting system are attached to 250, 400 and 1,000 kg free-fall general-purpose bombs. The French Air Force discontinued the purchases due to the higher cost compared to the US Paveway family bombs that were adopted as an interim solution while waiting for the French-made AASM family of guided bombs to enter service.

The BGLs were combat-proven over Bosnia in 1994–1995 and in the Kosovo conflict in Spring 1999.

The BGL series of bombs includes:
 BGL-250 – 250 kg bomb
 BGL-400 – 400 kg bomb
 BGL-1000 – 1,000 kg bomb

References

Guided bombs
Aerial bombs of France
Military equipment introduced in the 1970s